This is a list of notable events in music that took place in the year 1908.

Specific locations
1908 in Norwegian music

Specific genres
1908 in jazz

Events
January 26 – Sergei Rachmaninoff's Symphony No. 2 receives its première.
March 15 – Maurice Ravel's Rapsodie espagnole receives its première in Paris.
April 11 – Spyridon Samaras's opera Rhea is premiered in Florence (Teatro Verdi)
September 19 – Première of Gustav Mahler's Symphony No. 7 in Prague.
November 18 – Release in France of the film The Assassination of the Duke of Guise with a score from Saint-Saëns.
December 3 – Edward Elgar's Symphony No. 1 receives its première in Manchester.
December 18 – Claude Debussy's Children's Corner receives its première in Paris.
Anthony Maggio publishes a dance band orchestration of early Blues "I Got The Blues" in New Orleans.
Opera singer Amelita Galli marries the Marchese Luigi Curci, and acquires the name by which she becomes best-known.
Claude Debussy marries Emma Bardac.

Published popular music

"The ABCs of the U.S.A." w.m. George M. Cohan from the musical The Yankee Prince
 "All For Love Of You" w. Dave Reed m. Ernest R. Ball
 "Any Old Port In A Storm" w. Arthur J. Lamb m. Kerry Mills
 "Black And White Rag" w.m. George Botsford
 "Call Round Any Old Time" w.m. Charles Moore & E. W. Rogers
 "Consolation" by Edward Madden
 "Cuddle Up A Little Closer, Lovey Mine" w. Otto Harbach m. Karl Hoschna
 "Daisies Won't Tell" w.m. Anita Owen
 "Down Among The Sugar Cane" w. Avery & Charles Hart m. Cecil Mack & Chris Smith
 "Down In Jungle Town" w. Edward Madden m. Theodore F. Morse
 "Dusty Rag" m. May Aufderhelde
 "The Fairest Of The Fair" w.m. John Philip Sousa
 "Feed The Kitty" w. Ed Moran m. J. Fred Helf
 "Fig Leaf Rag" by Scott Joplin
 "Gee But There's Class To A Girl Like You" w.m. W. R. Williams
 "Golliwog's Cake Walk" m. Claude Debussy
 "Good Evening, Caroline" by Albert Von Tilzer & Jack Norworth
 "Ham And !" by Arthur Marshall
 "Has Anybody Here Seen Kelly?" w.m. C. W. Murphy & Will Letters.  With new lyrics by William McKenna it was performed by Nora Bayes in the 1910 Broadway production of the musical The Jolly Bachelors
 "Hoo-oo Ain't You Calling Me" w.m. Herbert Ingraham
 "I Hear You Calling Me" w. Harold Harford (actual name Harold Lake) m. Charles Marshall
 "I Want To Be Loved Like A Leading Lady" w. Paul West m. Herman Avery Wade
 "If I Had A Thousand Lives To Live" w. Sylvester Maguire m. Alfred Solman
"If You Cared for Me" by E. Rose
 "I'm A Yiddish Cowboy" w. Edgar Leslie m. Al Piantodosi & Halsey K. Mohr
 "I'm Glad I'm Married" w. Jack Norworth m. Albert Von Tilzer
 "I'm Looking For The Man That Wrote "The Merry Widow Waltz"" w. Edgar Selden m. Seymour Furth
 "In The Garden Of My Heart" w. Caro Roma m. Ernest R. Ball
 "It's Moonlight All The Time On Broadway" Wenrich
 "It's The Pretty Things You Say" w. Alfred Bryan m. Ted Snyder
 "I've Taken Quite A Fancy To You" w. Edward Madden m. Theodore F. Morse
 "Kerry Mills' Barn Dance" w. Thurland Chattaway m. Kerry Mills
 "The Longest Way 'Round Is The Sweetest Way Home" w. Ren Shields m. Kerry Mills
 "Love Is Like A Cigarette" w. Glen MacDonough m. Victor Herbert
 "Love Me Like I Want To Be Loved" w. Earle C. Jones & Alfred Bryan m. George W. Meyer
 "Love's Roundelay" w. Joseph Herbert m. Oscar Straus
 "Make A Noise Like A Hoop And Roll Away" w. Ren Shields m. J. Fred Helf
 "Meet Me In Rose-Time, Rosie" w. William Jerome m. Jean Schwartz
 "Mephisto Rag" by Anthony J. Stasny
 "Mother Hasn't Spoken To Father Since" w. William Jerome m. Jean Schwartz
 "My Brudda Sylvest'" w. Jesse Lasky m. Fred Fisher
 "My Girl's A Yorkshire Girl" w.m. C. W. Murphy & Dan Lipton
 "Now I Have To Call Him Father" w.m. Charles Collins & Fred Godfrey
 "The Old Time Rag" w. Edward Madden m. Theodore Morse
 "Pine Apple Rag" by Scott Joplin
 "Roses Bring Dreams Of You" w.m. Herbert Ingraham
 "She Sells Sea-Shells" w. Terry Sullivan m. Harry Gifford
 "Shine On Harvest Moon" w. Jack Norworth m. Nora Bayes & Jack Norworth
 "A Singer Sang A Song" w. Will Heelan m. Seymour Furth
 "Smarty" w. Jack Norworth m. Albert Von Tilzer
 "Somebody Lied" w.m. Jeff T. Branen & Evans Lloyd
 "Sun Bird m. Kerry Mills
 "Sweetest Gal In Town" w.m. Bob Cole & J. Rosamond Johnson
 "Sweetest Maid Of All" w. Joseph Herbert m. Oscar Straus  
 "Take Me Out to the Ball Game" w. Jack Norworth m. Albert Von Tilzer
 "Up In A Balloon" w. Ren Shields m. Percy Wenrich
 "A Vision Of Salome" m. J. Bodewalt Lampe
 "When Highland Mary Danced The Highland Fling" w. Jack Mahoney m. Harry Von Tilzer
 "When It's Moonlight On The Prairie" w. Robert F. Roden m. S. R. Henry
 "When We Are M-A-Double-R-I-E-D" w.m. George M. Cohan from the musical Fifty Miles From Boston
 "The Whitewash Man" w. William Jerome m. Jean Schwartz
 "The Yama Yama Man" w. Collin Davis m. Karl Hoschna
 "Yip-I-Addy-I-Ay!" w. Will D. Cobb m. John H. Flynn
 "You Will Have To Sing An Irish Song" w. Jack Norworth m. Albert Von Tilzer
 "You're In The Right Church, But The Wrong Pew" w. Cecil Mack m. Chris Smith

Hit recordings
 " The Small Town Gal" – George M. Cohan
 "All She Gets from the Iceman Is Ice" – Ada Jones

Classical music
Kurt Atterberg – Rhapsody for Piano and Orchestra
Béla Bartók – First Violin Concerto
Alban Berg – Piano Sonata, Op.1
York Bowen – Viola Concerto in C minor
Henry Walford Davies – Solemn Melody for organ
George Enescu –
Cantate pour la pose de la prèmiere pierre du pont à transbordeur de Bordeaux, for military band, two harps, string orchestra, solo cello, choir, baritone solo, and cannons
"Morgengebet", for voice and piano
Sept chansons de Clement Marot, for tenor and piano, Op. 15
Gabriel Fauré –
Nocturne No. 9 in B minor, Op. 97
Nocturne No. 10 in E minor, Op. 99
Serenade for cello and piano, Op. 98
Alexander Glazunov - Symphony No. 8
Reinhold Glière – Second Symphony, Op. 25
Hamilton Harty – Violin Concerto
Mikhail Ippolitov-Ivanov – Symphony No. 1
John Ireland – Phantasy Piano Trio
Charles Ives – 
Prelude on Eventide
The Unanswered Question
Paul von Klenau – Symphony No. 1
Toivo Kuula – Piano Trio
Gian Francesco Malipiero – Sinfonie del silenzio e della morte
Erkki Melartin – Third String Quartet
Carl Nielsen – Saga-Drøm (tone poem)
Max Reger –
Auferstanden, auferstanden, cantata for SATB soloists, SATB choir, and organ
Sonatinas for two pianos (4), Op. 89
Suite, for violin and piano, in E minor
Trio No. 2, for violin, cello, and piano, Op. 102
Violin Concerto, in A major, Op. 101
 Symphonischer Prolog zu einer Tragödie in A minor, Op. 108
Weihegesang, for alto solo, SATB choir, and winds
Zwei geistliche Lieder, for choir
Xaver Scharwenka – Piano Concerto No. 4 in F minor
Arnold Schoenberg – 
Lieder (2), Op. 14 
String Quartet No. 2 – premiered in Vienna
Alexander Scriabin – The Poem of Ecstasy
Igor Stravinsky – Feu d'artifice
May Summerbelle 'Beaux Yeux' Waltz for solo piano
Anton Webern – Passacaglia for orchestra, Op. 1

Opera
Paul Le Flem – Aucassin et Nicolette

Film
Camille Saint-Saëns - La Mort du duc de Guise

Musical theater
 Algeria Broadway production opened at The Broadway Theatre on August 31 and ran for 48 performances
 The Belle of Brittany opened at the Queen's Theatre in London on 24 October 1908 with music by Howard Talbot to a book by Leedham Bantock and lyrics by Percy Greenbank
 The Dollar Princess Manchester production
 Fifty Miles from Boston Broadway production opened on February 3 at the Garrick Theatre and ran for 40 performances
 The King of Cadonia London production opened at the Prince of Wales Theatre on September 3 and ran for 333 performances
 Mr. Hamlet of Broadway Broadway production opened at the Casino Theatre on December 23 and ran for 54 performances
 My Mimosa Maid London production opened at the Prince Of Wales Theatre on April 21 and ran for 83 performances
 Der Tapfere Soldat (The Chocolate Soldier) (Rudolf Friml) Vienna production opened at the Theater an der Wien on November 14 and ran for 62 performances
 The Three Twins opened at the Herald Square Theatre on June 15 and moved to the Majestic Theatre on January 18, 1909, for a total run of 289 performances
 A Waltz Dream London production opened at the Hicks Theatre on March 7 and ran for 146 performances.
 A Waltz Dream Broadway production opened at the Broadway Theatre on January 27 and ran for 111 performances
The Yankee Prince Broadway production opened at the Knickerbocker Theatre on April 20 and ran for 112 performances
 Ziegfeld Follies Broadway revue opened at the Jardin de Paris on June 15 and ran for 120 performances

Births
January 7 – Red Allen, jazz musician (d. 1967)
January 14 – Russ Columbo, singer, bandleader, composer (d. 1934)
January 16 –  Ethel Merman, American singer and actress (d. 1984)
January 26
Stéphane Grappelli, musician, composer (d. 1997)
Ernst Oster, pianist, musicologist, and music theorist (d. 1977)
January 27 – Hot Lips Page, jazz trumpet (d. 1954)
February 20 – Ruby Elzy, US soprano, first Serena in Porgy and Bess (d. 1943)
February 29 – A. L. Lloyd, folk song collector (d. 1982)
March 14 – Nikolai Rakov, Soviet composer (d. 1990)
March 18 – Ivor Moreton, British singer, composer and pianist (d. 1984)
April 2 – Buddy Ebsen, US actor and singer (d. 2003)
April 5 – Herbert von Karajan, Austrian conductor (d. 1989)
April 7 – Percy Faith, composer, musician (d. 1976)
April 8 – Tito Guízar, Mexican singer and film actor (d. 1999)  
April 15 – eden ahbez, hermit, musician (d. 1995)
April 20 – Lionel Hampton, jazz musician, bandleader (d. 2002)
May 6 – Necil Kazım Akses, Turkish composer (d. 1999)
May 8 – Cristian Vasile, Romanian tango singer (d. 1985)
May 15 – Lars-Erik Larsson, Swedish composer (d. 1986)
May 27 – Harold Rome, US songwriter (d. 1993)
June 24 – Hugo Distler, organist and composer (d. 1942)
June 29 – Leroy Anderson, US composer and conductor (d. 1975)
July 8 – Louis Jordan, bandleader (d. 1975)
July 22 – Ljerko Spiller, Croat-Argentine violinist (d. 2008) 
July 25 – Semmangudi Srinivasa Iyer, Carnatic vocalist (d. 2003)
August 1 – Miloslav Kabeláč, composer (d. 1979)
August 4 – Kurt Eichhorn, conductor (d. 1994)
August 12 – Nina Makarova, composer (d. 1976)
August 29 – Orestes López, Cuban bassist, cellist, pianist and composer (d. 1991)
September 5 - Cecilia Seghizzi, Italian composer
September 6 – Maria Grinberg, pianist (d. 1978)
September 7 – Max Kaminsky, US jazz trumpeter (d. 1961)
September 10 – Raymond Scott, composer, bandleader, and electronic music pioneer (d. 1994)
September 13 – Mae Questel, US singer (d. 1998)
September 16 – Chick Bullock, US singer (d. 1981)
September 25 – Eugen Suchoň, Slovak composer (d. 1993)
September 30 – David Oistrakh, violinist (d. 1974)
October 1 – Umar Dimayev, Chechen folk singer (d. 1972)
October 14 – Allan Jones, actor, singer (d. 1992)
October 19 – Geirr Tveitt, Norwegian composer (d. 1981)
October 20 – Stuart Hamblen, US singer, actor and songwriter (d. 1989)
October 21
Harry Stewart, comedian, singer, and songwriter (d. 1956)
Howard Ferguson, British composer and musicologist (d. 1999)
November 19 
Jean-Yves Daniel-Lesur, French organist and composer (d. 2002)
Keg Johnson, US jazz trombonist (d. 1967)
December 10 – Olivier Messiaen, composer (d. 1992)
December 11 – Elliott Carter, composer (d. 2012)
December 16 – Frances Day, US actress and singer (d. 1984)
December 17 – William Brocklesby Wordsworth, English/Scottish composer and pianist (died 1988)
December 21 – Gregory Egiazarovich Yeghiazarian, Armenian composer (died 1988)

Deaths
January 22 – August Wilhelmj, German violinist, 62
January 23 – Edward MacDowell, American composer (b. 1860)
February 28 – Pauline Lucca, operatic soprano (b. 1842)
March 2 – Walter Slaughter, conductor and composer (b. 1860)
March 12 – Clara Novello, soprano (b. 1818)
March 26 – Louis Chauvin, ragtime musician (b. 1881)
April 29 – Auguste Götze, German classical singer and vocal pedagogue (b. 1840)
May 7 – Ludovic Halévy, lyricist (b. 1834)
May 12 – Melisio Morales, composer (b. 1838)
June 5 – Josef Wagner, composer (b. 1856)
June 20 – Federico Chueca, zarzuela composer (b. 1846)
June 21 – Nikolai Rimsky-Korsakov, composer (b. 1844)
July 10 – Phoebe Knapp, composer of hymns (b. 1839)
July 14 – William Mason, pianist and composer (b. 1829)
July 18 – Jaime Nunó, composer of Mexico's national anthem (b. 1824)
August 13 – Ira D. Sankey, gospel singer and composer (b. 1840)
August 20 – Louisa Bassano, opera singer (b. 1818)
August 26 – Tony Pastor, vaudeville founder & theater impresario (b. 1837)
September 20 – Pablo de Sarasate, violinist (b. 1844)
September 21 – Atanas Badev, composer and music teacher (b. 1860)
November 15 – Katti Lanner, ballet dancer and choreographer (b. 1829)
November 20 – Albert Dietrich, conductor and composer (b. 1829)
date unknown – Alois Kaiser, cantor and composer (b. 1840)

References

 
20th century in music
Music by year